Jackson Kakunta (born 24 October 1998) is a Zambian football goalkeeper who plays for Power Dynamos.

References

1998 births
Living people
Zambian footballers
Zambia international footballers
Power Dynamos F.C. players
Red Arrows F.C. players
Association football goalkeepers